Arthur Walter Adams White (October 10, 1907 – July 9, 1973) was a Canadian lawyer and politician.

White was born in East Zorra Township to James and Floria White (née Adams).  His parents had emigrated from England in 1903 and moved to Galt (now Cambridge, Ontario) in 1908, when Arthur was a year old.  Arthur White attended the Galt Collegiate Institute and St. Michael's College School in Toronto.  He went on to earn a B.A. from the University of Toronto and obtained a law degree from Osgoode Hall in 1938.

White established a legal practice in Galt in 1939, and became involved in civic life.  In the 1953 federal election, he was elected under the Liberal Party of Canada banner to represent the riding of Waterloo South.  Defeated in the 1957 election, he returned to Galt politics and as a member of the Parks Board campaigned fiercely for Galt's 1959 purchase of the farm which is now Churchill Park.

Arthur White Street in Cambridge, Ontario is named for him.

Electoral record

References

External links 
 

Liberal Party of Canada MPs
Members of the House of Commons of Canada from Ontario
People from Cambridge, Ontario
1907 births
1973 deaths